The following is an episode list for the CBS sitcom The Munsters. The series began broadcast on September 24, 1964, and ended on May 12, 1966. 

Munster, Go Home! was a feature-length theatrical film released on June 15, 1966. A made-for-television film, entitled The Munsters' Revenge, aired 15 years later on February 27, 1981.

Series overview

Episodes

Pilots

Season 1 (1964–65)

Season 2 (1965–66)

Special (1965)

References

External links 
 
 

Episodes
Munsters